Soul of the Slums is a 1931 American Pre-Code crime melodrama directed by Frank R. Strayer from an original screenplay by W. Scott Darling. The film stars William Collier Jr., Blanche Mehaffey, and Murray Smith, and was released by Action Pictures on November 15, 1931.

Cast list
 William Collier Jr. as Jerry Harris
 Blanche Mehaffey as Molly
 Murray Smith as Spike
 James Bradbury Jr. as Dummy
 Walter Long as Pete Thompson
 Paul Weigel as Brother Jacob
 Max Asher as Pawnbroker

References

External links
 
 
 

Films directed by Frank R. Strayer
American crime drama films
1931 films
1931 crime drama films
American black-and-white films
Mayfair Pictures films
Melodrama films
1930s English-language films
1930s American films